Chen Tiexin (born April 1955) is a former Chinese politician. Between 2013 and 2014 Chen served as the vice chairman of the Liaoning Provincial Committee of the Chinese People's Political Consultative Conference, a largely ceremonial legislative consultation body. Prior to that he served as the mayor of Dandong and the party secretary of Chaoyang. Chen was placed under investigation by the Communist Party's anti-corruption body in May 2014, and was the first high-ranking official being examined from Liaoning province.

Career
Chen was born and raised in Liaoyang, Liaoning, he earned a PhD in Economics degree from Jilin University in December 1995.

He got involved in politics in December 1972 and joined the Chinese Communist Party in March 1975.

During the Cultural Revolution, he worked in Heishan Village of Dengta County as a sent-down youth.

Beginning in 1983, he served in several posts in Shenyang, capital of Liaoning province, including general manager, director, and secretary of party committee. 

He was appointed as the deputy party secretary and mayor of Dandong in March 2004, a position he held until February 2008, when he was transferred to Chaoyang as the party secretary. When he took office in Chaoyang, he wrote the lyrics for Fengming Chaoyang (Phoenix Singing in Chaoyang), a hit song sung by Chen Sisi.

In February 2013 he was promoted to become the vice chairman of the Liaoning Provincial Committee of the Chinese People's Political Consultative Conference.

Downfall
On July 24, 2014, Chen was being investigated by the Central Commission for Discipline Inspection of the Chinese Communist Party for "serious violations of laws and regulations". On July 30, Chen was dismissed from his position by the government.

Chen Tiexin was expelled from the Communist Party on October 28, 2014. On November 22, 2016, Chen was sentenced to 13 years and 9 months in prison for bribery.

References

1955 births
Living people
Expelled members of the Chinese Communist Party
People's Republic of China politicians from Liaoning
Politicians from Liaoyang
Political office-holders in Liaoning
Jilin University alumni
Chinese politicians convicted of corruption
Chinese Communist Party politicians from Liaoning